Feel the Music may refer to:

 Feel the Music (Ray Stevens album), 1977
 Feel the Music (Dayton album), 1983